Merope , designated 23 Tauri (abbreviated 23 Tau), is a star in the constellation of Taurus and a member of the Pleiades star cluster.

Distance
Despite being one of the closest star clusters to Earth, the distance to the Pleiades and its member stars is still in dispute.  The parallax of Merope itself is not known precisely enough to give an accurate distance.  Its Hipparcos parallax has a statistical margin of error of about 5% and gave a distance 116 parsecs.  This, and an overall distance to the Pleiades calculated from Hipparcos parallaxes of 120 parsecs, are inconsistent with other parallax measurements such as from Gaia. Merope is too bright for Gaia to have a reliable parallax for it, but calculations of the overall distance to the Pleiades cluster using Hipparcos, Gaia, Hubble Space Telescope, and other methods repeatedly show that the Hipparcos parallaxes suffered from some kind of systemic error, and the distance to the Pleiades is most likely around 135 parsecs.

Description

Merope is a blue-white B-type subgiant with a mean apparent magnitude of +4.18. Richard Hinckley Allen described the star as lucid white and violet. It is classified as a Beta Cephei type variable star and its brightness varies by 0.01 magnitudes. It is given the variable star designation of V971 Tauri.

These possible companions have not been confirmed.

Surrounding Merope is the Merope Nebula (NGC 1435).  It appears brightest around Merope and is listed in the Index Catalogue as number IC 349.

Nomenclature 

23 Tauri is the star's Flamsteed designation. The name Merope originates with Greek mythology; she is one of the seven daughters of Atlas and Pleione known as the Pleiades. In 2016, the International Astronomical Union organized a Working Group on Star Names (WGSN) to catalog and standardize proper names for stars. The WGSN's first bulletin of July 2016 included a table of the first two batches of names approved by the WGSN; which included Merope for this star. It is now so entered in the IAU Catalog of Star Names.

References

External links 

Jim Kaler's Stars, University of Illinois:Merope (23 Tauri)
NGC 1435 - Merope Nebula LRGB image with 4 hours total exposure.

Tauri, 023
Taurus (constellation)
Beta Cephei variables
Pleiades Open Cluster
B-type subgiants
Merope
1156
017608
023480
Durchmusterung objects
?
Tauri, V971